The 2011 elections to Cheshire West and Chester Borough Council were the first elections to this Council after it had been re-warded into a mixture of single-, two- and three-member wards. They took place on 5 May alongside the 2011 United Kingdom Alternative Vote referendum. The previous election held for 2008 were based on the old Cheshire County Council electoral divisions each of which returned 3 members. The 2008 elections elected 72 members to serve first on the shadow authority and then, with effect from 1 April 2009, the new Council when it took over responsibility for the delivery of local government services.

Given the re-warding that took place in time for the 2011 elections, direct comparisons between the 2008 and 2011 results are problematic. Superficially, the 2011 results give the impression of a dramatic swing to Labour when compared with the 2008 results; however, this is misleading. In 2008, the Labour Party was particularly unpopular, with the local government elections taking place shortly after the '10p tax rate' had been abolished, plunging Labour support to a particular low. This unpopularity, coupled with the then large electoral wards electing three councillors per ward, and the first-past-the-post system, very much favoured the then leading party in the opinion polls – the Conservatives – who, in 2008, won a much greater majority than had otherwise been predicted.

The 2011 elections with the re-warding took place one year into the national Conservative–Liberal Democrat coalition, at a time when support for the Liberal Democrats was at a particular low. Nationally, Labour's support had rallied considerably when compared with 2008.

Before the elections in 2011, the majority Conservative party suffered a small number of defections, principally almost certainly associated with existing councillors failing to be selected by the party to fight the seat of their choice.

As noted, the Conservatives had reduced in number from 55 to 50 through resignations, defections and withdrawal of the party whip associated with the processes for selection of candidates to fight the 2011 election.

Four political groups which had unsuccessfully put forward candidates in 2008 did not do so in 2011. Several deselected Conservatives stood without the party whip, but there were no other independent candidates.

Results summary

|- style="text-align:center; background-color:#F2F2F2;"
! style="border: 1px solid #aaa;" colspan=2 | Political party
! style="border: 1px solid #aaa;" | Group leader
! style="border: 1px solid #aaa;" | Candidates
! style="border: 1px solid #aaa;" | Total votes
! style="border: 1px solid #aaa;" | Total seats
! style="border: 1px solid #aaa;" | Seats, net change
! style="border: 1px solid #aaa;" | Seats, of total (%)
! style="border: 1px solid #aaa;" | Votes, of total (%)
! style="border: 1px solid #aaa;" | Total votes, change (%)
|-
| data-sort-value="Conservative Party (UK)" 
| style="border: 1px solid #aaa; text-align: left;" scope="row" | 
| style="border: 1px solid #aaa; text-align: left;" | Mike Jones
| style="border: 1px solid #aaa;" | 75
| style="border: 1px solid #aaa;" | 84,705
| style="border: 1px solid #aaa;" | 42
| style="border: 1px solid #aaa;" |  8
| style="border: 1px solid #aaa;" | 56
| style="border: 1px solid #aaa;" | 45.34
| style="border: 1px solid #aaa;" | 
|-
| data-sort-value="Labour Party (UK)" 
| style="border: 1px solid #aaa; text-align: left;" scope="row" | 
| style="border: 1px solid #aaa; text-align: left;" | Derek Bateman
| style="border: 1px solid #aaa;" | 75
| style="border: 1px solid #aaa;" | 69,829
| style="border: 1px solid #aaa;" | 32
| style="border: 1px solid #aaa;" |  19
| style="border: 1px solid #aaa;" | 42.6
| style="border: 1px solid #aaa;" | 37.38
| style="border: 1px solid #aaa;" | 
|-
| data-sort-value="Liberal Democrats (UK)" 
| style="border: 1px solid #aaa; text-align: left;" scope="row" | 
| style="border: 1px solid #aaa; text-align: left;" 
| style="border: 1px solid #aaa;" | 51
| style="border: 1px solid #aaa;" | 22,223
| style="border: 1px solid #aaa;" | 1
| style="border: 1px solid #aaa;" |  3
| style="border: 1px solid #aaa;" | 1.33
| style="border: 1px solid #aaa;" | 11.90
| style="border: 1px solid #aaa;" | 
|-
| data-sort-value="Independent" 
| style="border: 1px solid #aaa; text-align: left;" scope="row" | 
| style="border: 1px solid #aaa; text-align: left;" 
| style="border: 1px solid #aaa;" | 9
| style="border: 1px solid #aaa;" | 5,732
| style="border: 1px solid #aaa;" | 0
| style="border: 1px solid #aaa;" |  4
| style="border: 1px solid #aaa;" | 0
| style="border: 1px solid #aaa;" | 3.07
| style="border: 1px solid #aaa;" | 
|-
| data-sort-value="United Kingdom Independence Party" 
| style="border: 1px solid #aaa; text-align: left;" scope="row" | 
| style="border: 1px solid #aaa; text-align: left;" | Richard Lowe
| style="border: 1px solid #aaa;" | 15
| style="border: 1px solid #aaa;" | 2,889
| style="border: 1px solid #aaa;" | 0
| style="border: 1px solid #aaa;" |  1
| style="border: 1px solid #aaa;" | 0
| style="border: 1px solid #aaa;" | 1.55
| style="border: 1px solid #aaa;" | 
|-
| data-sort-value="Green Party of England and Wales" 
| style="border: 1px solid #aaa; text-align: left;" scope="row" | 
| style="border: 1px solid #aaa; text-align: left;" 
| style="border: 1px solid #aaa;" | 4
| style="border: 1px solid #aaa;" | 1,042
| style="border: 1px solid #aaa;" | 0
| style="border: 1px solid #aaa;" | 
| style="border: 1px solid #aaa;" | 0
| style="border: 1px solid #aaa;" | 0.56
| style="border: 1px solid #aaa;" | 
|-
| data-sort-value="Socialist Labour Party (UK)" 
| style="border: 1px solid #aaa; text-align: left;" scope="row" | 
| style="border: 1px solid #aaa; text-align: left;" 
| style="border: 1px solid #aaa;" | 1
| style="border: 1px solid #aaa;" | 251
| style="border: 1px solid #aaa;" | 0
| style="border: 1px solid #aaa;" | 
| style="border: 1px solid #aaa;" | 0
| style="border: 1px solid #aaa;" | 0.13
| style="border: 1px solid #aaa;" | 
|-
| data-sort-value="British National Party (UK)" 
| style="border: 1px solid #aaa; text-align: left;" scope="row" | 
| style="border: 1px solid #aaa; text-align: left;" 
| style="border: 1px solid #aaa;" | 1
| style="border: 1px solid #aaa;" | 151
| style="border: 1px solid #aaa;" | 0
| style="border: 1px solid #aaa;" | 
| style="border: 1px solid #aaa;" | 0
| style="border: 1px solid #aaa;" | 0.08
| style="border: 1px solid #aaa;" | 
|}

Seat composition between 2008 (top) and 2011 (bottom):

Councillor changes

New councillors
David Armstrong (Labour, Winsford Swanlow and Dene)
Alex Black (Labour, Hoole)
Tom Blackmore (Labour, Winsford Over and Verdin)
Stephen Burns (Labour, Winsford Swanlow and Dene)
Keith Butcher (Labour, Ledsham and Manor)
Samantha Dixon (Labour, Chester City)
Paul Dolan (Labour, Winnington and Castle)
Charles Fifield (Conservative, Weaver and Cuddington)
Carolyn Graham (Labour, Blacon)
Howard Greenwood (Conservative, Farndon)
Louise Gittins (Labour, Little Neston and Burton)
Don Hammond (Conservative, Marbury)
Graham Heatley (Conservative, Elton)
Mark Henesy (Labour, Sutton)
Brian Jones (Labour, Whitby)
Lynda Jones (Conservative, Winsford Over and Verdin)
Tony Lawrenson (Labour, Witton and Rudheath)
John Leather (Conservative, Tarvin and Kelsall)
Nicole Meardon (Labour, Sutton)
Amy Mercer-Bailey (Labour, Winnington and Castle)
Eveleigh Moore Dutton (Conservative, Tarporley)
Margaret Parker (Conservative, Chester Villages)
Ben Powell (Labour, St Paul's)
Diane Roberts (Labour, Netherpool)
David Robinson (Labour, Boughton)
Bob Rudd (Labour, Garden Quarter)
Gaynor Sinar (Conservative, Davenham and Moulton)
Neil Sullivan (Conservative, Handbridge Park)
Julia Tickridge (Labour, Witton and Rudheath)
Elton Watson (Conservative, Davenham and Moulton)
Andrew Williams (Labour, Neston)

Outgoing councillors
Brian Anderson (Conservative)
Kimberley Anderson (Conservative)
Brian Bailey (Independent)
Bob Barton (Liberal Democrats)
Kate Birtwistle (Conservative)
Terry Birtwistle (Conservative)
Lynn Clare (Labour)
Linda Cooper (Conservative)
Max Drury (Conservative)
John Ebo (Conservative)
Malcolm Gaskill (Liberal Democrats)
Arthur Harada (Conservative)
Mark Ingram (Conservative)
Katherine Lord (Conservative)
Pat Lott (Conservative)
Richard Lowe (UKIP)
Jan Mashlan (Conservative)
Simon McDonald (Independent)
William Mealor (Conservative)
George Miller (Conservative)
Andrew Needham (Conservative)
Charlie Parkinson (Liberal Democrats)
Neil Ritchie (Conservative)
Barbara Roberts (Independent)
Richard Short (Conservative)
Graham Smith (Conservative)
Andrew Storrar (Independent)
Keith Wilson (Conservative)

Re-elected councillors
Gareth Anderson (Conservative, Ledsham and Manor)
Derek Bateman (Labour, Ellesmere Port Town)
Don Beckett (Winsford Over and Verdin, Labour)
Keith Board (Conservative, Great Boughton)
Pamela Booher (Labour, Winsford Wharton)
Malcolm Byram (Conservative, Marbury)
Brian Clarke (Labour, Winsford Wharton)
Angela Claydon (Labour, St Paul's)
Bob Crompton (Conservative, Whitby)
Brian Crowe (Conservative, Saughall and Mollington)
Razia Daniels (Conservative, Handbridge Park)
Andrew Dawson (Conservative, Frodsham)
Hugo Deynem (Conservative, Tarvin and Kelsall)
Paul Donovan (Labour, Sutton)
Brenda Dowding (Conservative, Parkgate)
Leslie Ford (Conservative, Helsby)
John Grimshaw (Conservative, Weaver and Cuddington)
Pamela Hall (Conservative, Great Boughton)
Myles Hogg (Conservative, Willaston and Thornton)
Jill Houlbrook (Conservative, Upton)
Eleanor Johnson (Conservative, Gowy)
Mike Jones (Conservative, Tattenhall)
Reggie Jones (Labour, Blacon)
Kay Loch (Conservative, Little Neston and Burton)
Justin Madders (Labour, Ellesmere Port Town)
Herbert Manley (Conservative, Hartford and Greenbank)
Alan McKie (Conservative, Weaver and Cuddington)
Hilarie McNae (Conservative, Upton)
Pat Merrick (Labour, Rossmore)
Keith Musgrave (Conservative, Hartford and Greenbank)
Marie Nelson (Labour, Blacon)
Ralph Oultram (Conservative, Kingsley)
Stuart Parker (Conservative, Chester Villages)
Tom Parry (Conservative, Newton)
Lynn Riley (Conservative, Frodsham)
Tony Sherlock (Labour, Grange)
Mark Stocks (Conservative, Shakerley)
Alexandra Tate (Labour, Lache)
Bob Thompson (Liberal Democrats, Hoole)
Adrian Walmsley (Conservative, Newton)
Helen Weltman (Conservative, Davenham and Moulton)
Mark Williams (Conservative, Dodleston and Huntington)
Ann Wright (Conservative, Malpas)
Norman Wright (Conservative, Marbury)

Results by ward

Blacon

Boughton

Chester City

Chester Villages

Davenham and Moulton

Dodleston and Huntington

Ellesmere Port Town

Elton

Farndon

Frodsham

Garden Quarter

Gowy

Grange

Great Boughton

Handbridge Park

Hartford and Greenbank

Helsby

Hoole

Kingsley

Lache

Ledsham and Manor

Little Neston and Burton

Malpas

Marbury

Neston

Netherpool

Newton

Parkgate

Rossmore

Saughall and Mollington

Shakerley

St Paul's

Strawberry

Sutton

Tarporley

Tarvin and Kelsall

Tattenhall

Upton

Weaver and Cuddington

Whitby

Willaston and Thornton

Winnington and Castle

Winsford Over and Verdin

Winsford Swanlow and Dene

Winsford Wharton

Witton and Rudheath

Notes

References

2011 English local elections
2011
2010s in Cheshire